Glyphostoma scobina is a species of sea snail, a marine gastropod mollusk in the family Clathurellidae.

Description

Distribution
This species occurs in the Pacific Ocean along the Galápagos Islands and Isla Gorgona, Colombia.

References

scobina